Australobius palnis is a species of centipedes in the family Lithobiidae. It is known only from Sri Lanka.

References

palnis
Endemic fauna of Sri Lanka
Animals described in 1973